Love, Theft and Other Entanglements is a 2015 Palestinian drama film directed by Muayad Alayan. It was screened in the Panorama section of the 65th Berlin International Film Festival.

Cast
 Sami Metwasi
 Maya Abu Alhayyat
 Riyad Sliman
 Ramzi Maqdisi
 Kamel El Basha

See also
 List of Palestinian films

References

External links
 

2015 films
2015 drama films
Palestinian drama films
2010s Arabic-language films